The  is a Japanese daily "broadsheet" newspaper published in mostly Aichi Prefecture and neighboring regions by  Based in Nagoya, one of Japanese three major metropolitan areas, it boasts the third circulation after the group newspaper Total Yomiuri Shimbun and The Asahi Shimbun. Even the Chunichi Shimbun alone exceeds the number of copies of the Sankei Shimbun. The newspaper is dominant in its region, with a market penetration approaching 60 percent of the population of Aichi Prefecture. The Chunichi Shimbun group also publishes the Tokyo Shimbun, the Chunichi Sports, and the Tokyo Chunichi Sports newspapers. While each newspaper maintains independent leadership and is considered a "separate" paper, the group's combined circulation in 2022 was 2,321,414, ranking third in Japan behind the Yomiuri Shimbun and the Asahi Shimbun.

This is Japan's second largest leftist newspaper. It is positioned as a representative newspaper of Nagoya.

It is also the owner of the Chunichi Dragons baseball team.

History 
The newspaper was formerly known as Nagoya Shimbun. From 1936–1940 it owned the Japanese Baseball League team Nagoya Kinko. The paper acquired the Chubu Nihon (now Chunichi Dragons) in 1946.

Foreign Correspondence Network 
The group has thirteen foreign bureaus.  They are in New York City, Washington, D.C., London, Paris, Berlin, Moscow, Cairo, Beijing, Shanghai, Taipei, Seoul, Manila, and Bangkok.

Political position 
The Chunichi Shimbun holds progressive views, and has political tendencies towards liberalism, social democracy and socialism.

It supported the Japan Socialist Party in the Showa period, the Democratic Party of Japan and Social Democratic Party (Japan) in the Heisei period, and the Constitutional Democratic Party of Japan in the Reiwa period. Nagoya, where the headquarters is located, is called the Democratic Kingdom (Minshu-Ōkoku, 民主王国).

The two prewar newspapers (Shin-Aichi and Nagoya Shimbun) were conservative in the Chunichi Shimbun, but the founder, Kissen Kobayashi, ran for the mayor of Nagoya in 1951 at the recommendation of the Japan Socialist Party (first rejected, 1952). It was elected in the year) and changed to a left-leaning newspaper supported by the Japan Socialist Party. The Tokyo Shimbun was once a right wing, but when it was acquired by the Chunichi Shimbun in 1964, it changed to a left-leaning newspaper.

Probably because of this, the mass media reforms led by the Ministry of Posts and Telecommunications under the LDP administration in the Showa era (1955 system) were treated coldly, and it was not possible to become a national newspaper and to have its own TV station in Kanto. No (Tokyo 12 channel (currently TV Tokyo) was acquired by the Nikkei, and currently independent stations in the Kanto region such as Tokyo Metropolitan Television and TV Kanagawa are affiliated with the Chunichi Shimbun).

It was the only major newspaper against the Koizumi reforms, and the Asahi Shimbun and others agreed. Chunichi was the only one who opposed the TPP in a major newspaper. It is in a position to defend the labor unions.

Since the 2011 Fukushima nuclear disaster, it has taken an extremely strong anti-nuclear policy and publishes articles related to nuclear power every day. It also has a branch office in Fukushima Prefecture (not officially issued).

As a media company, the Yomiuri Shimbun Group and the Fujisankei Communications Group have a deep relationship with the conservative Liberal Democratic Party, while the Chunichi Group is a liberal newspaper and has a deep relationship with the Constitutional Democratic Party of Japan.

The Asahi Shimbun has a close relationship with the Kōchikai, a moderate faction of the Liberal Democratic Party.

It opposes the revision of the constitution and the prime minister's visit to Yasukuni Shrine.

This newspaper is skeptical of the death penalty.

Group companies

Mass media 

 Chubu-Nippon Broadcasting
 Tokai Radio Broadcasting
 Tokai Television Broadcasting
 Ishikawa TV
 Toyama Television Broadcasting
 Fukui Television Broadcasting
 Mie Television
 Biwako Broadcasting

The following broadcasting stations are jointly funded by other major newspapers.
 Television Aichi - The Nikkei invested
 Hokuriku Asahi Broadcasting - Asahi Shimbun Company invested
 TV Shizuoka - Fujisankei Communications Group invested
 Shizuoka Asahi Television - Asahi Shimbun Company invested
 Nagano Broadcasting Systems - Fujisankei Communications Group invested
 Asahi Broadcasting Nagano - Asahi Shimbun Company invested
 TV Hokkaido - The Nikkei and Hokkaido Shimbun invested

Sports 
 Chunichi Dragons

Others 
 Chunichi Eiga-sha

See also

List of newspapers in Japan
Tokyo Shimbun - Chunichi Shimbun's Title in the Tokyo Metropolitan Area
Japanese Communist Party
Constitutional Democratic Party of Japan
Katsuya Okada - his little brother is an employee.
Aeon (company)
Hirotaka Akamatsu
Shoichi Kondo - Former employees
Yuko Mori
Japan Socialist Party
Social Democratic Party of Japan
Democratic Party of Japan
Fusae Ichikawa - Former employees
Seoul Shinmun - Affiliated newspaper in South Korea
Libération - Affiliated newspaper in France

References

Further reading

External links
  

1942 establishments in Japan
Daily newspapers published in Japan
Japanese-language newspapers
Centre-left newspapers
Left-wing newspapers
Liberal media in Japan
Social democratic media
Social democracy in Asia
Mass media in Nagoya
Newspapers established in 1942
Progressivism in Japan
Publications established in 1886